Shackford Head State Park is a public recreation area on Moose Island in the city of Eastport, Washington County, Maine. The  state park occupies a peninsula that separates Cobscook Bay and Broad Cove. The land is named for John Shackford, an American Revolutionary War soldier who once owned the headlands. The park is managed by the Maine Department of Agriculture, Conservation and Forestry.

Activities and amenities
The park has both inland and coastal hiking trails, including the Cony Beach Trail, Shackford Head Trail, and Schooner Trail. A plaque on Cony Beach marks the spot where five Civil War–era ships were burned for salvage during the early 1900s.

References

External links
Shackford Head State Park Department of Agriculture, Conservation and Forestry
Shackford Head State Park Guide & Map Department of Agriculture, Conservation and Forestry

State parks of Maine
Protected areas of Washington County, Maine
Protected areas established in 1989
1989 establishments in Maine
Beaches of Maine
Landforms of Washington County, Maine